The 1997–98 Slovenian Football Cup was the seventh season of the Slovenian Football Cup, Slovenia's football knockout competition.

Qualified clubs

1996–97 Slovenian PrvaLiga members
Beltinci
Celje
Gorica
Koper
Korotan Prevalje
Maribor
Mura
Olimpija
Primorje
Rudar Velenje

Qualified through MNZ Regional Cups
MNZ Ljubljana: Elan, Vevče, Domžale
MNZ Maribor: Železničar Maribor, Dravograd, Pohorje
MNZ Celje: Šentjur, Dravinja
MNZ Koper: Ilirska Bistrica, Branik Šmarje
MNZ Nova Gorica: Renče, Idrija
MNZ Murska Sobota: Beltinci, Bakovci, Serdica
MNZ Lendava: Nafta Lendava, Turnišče
MNZG-Kranj: Triglav Kranj, Lesce
MNZ Ptuj: Drava Ptuj, Aluminij, Dornava

First round

|}

Round of 16

|}

Quarter-finals

|}

Semi-finals

|}

Final

First leg

Second leg

References

Slovenian Football Cup seasons
Cup
Slovenian Cup